The doubles luge at the 2018 Winter Olympics was held on 14 February 2018 at the Alpensia Sliding Centre near Pyeongchang, South Korea. Tobias Wendl and Tobias Arlt, the defending champions, repeated their 2014 success and won gold medals. Peter Penz and Georg Fischler became second, and Toni Eggert third Sascha Benecken. Wendl and Arlt were also first in both runs, Penz and Fischler second in both runs, and Eggert and Benecken third in both runs. For Penz, Fischler, Eggert, and Benecken these were their first Olympic medals. The 2014 bronze medalists, Andris Šics and Juris Šics, were ninth in the first run and fourth in the second run, which was only sufficient for the fifth place overall.

Qualifying athletes

Competition schedule
All times are (UTC+9).

Results
Two runs were used to determine the winner.

References

Luge at the 2018 Winter Olympics
Men's events at the 2018 Winter Olympics